Cumberland Valley High School (CV) is a public high school founded in 1954. It is located in the Cumberland Valley School District of Mechanicsburg, Cumberland County, Pennsylvania. In the 2019–2020 school year, according to the National Center for Education Statistics, the school had 2,809 pupils enrolled in the ninth to twelfth grades. The school employed 150.75 full-time equivalent teachers yielding a student:teacher ratio of 18.66:1. The mascot is an Eagle.

The Cumberland Valley High School serves the four townships of Hampden, Middlesex, Monroe and Silver Spring in Cumberland County.  The area included in the school system extends from Carlisle to Camp Hill, Pennsylvania.  This area is suburban and is located fifteen miles west of Harrisburg.

The combined junior-senior high school opened in September 1954 to 800 students.  The school has steadily grown since that time. This is evident by the size of only the freshman class of 2014, which amounts to about 705 students.  All schools in the district, except for Monroe Elementary, have been re-built or remodeled due to significant student population growth.

Seven elementary schools and two middle schools funnel into the high school. The middle schools are: Mountain View Middle School and Eagle View Middle School.

The library (known as IMC, stands for "Instructional Materials Center"  ) is a learning center providing  books, magazines, daily newspapers, audiovisuals, and CD-ROMs.  Students use computers to access library resources, the Internet and to do word processing and graphical analysis.  They also have interlibrary loan privileges with other libraries in the state. The school has offered the International Baccalaureate Diploma Programme since 2011.

Extracurriculars
A wide variety of activities, clubs, and sports are offered to the students and community. In particular, the Cumberland Valley Science Olympiad team has seen great success in recent years, earning their first-ever state championship in April of 2022. Varsity and junior varsity athletic activities are under the Pennsylvania Interscholastic Athletics Association.

Sports
The District funds:

Boys
Baseball - AAAA
Basketball- AAAAAA
Bowling - AAAA
Cross Country - Class AAA
Football - AAAAAA
Golf - AAA
Lacrosse - AAAA
Soccer - AAA
Swimming and Diving - Class AAA
Tennis - AAA
Track and Field - AAA
Volleyball - Class AAA
Water Polo - AAAA
Wrestling - AAA

Girls
Basketball - AAAAAA
Bowling - AAAA
Cross Country - Class AAA
Field Hockey - AAA
Golf - AAA
Lacrosse - AAAA
Soccer (Fall) - AAA
Softball - AAAA
Swimming and Diving - AAA
Girls' Tennis - AAA
Track and Field - AAA
Volleyball -  AAA
Water Polo - AAAA
Cheerleading- AAAA

According to PIAA directory July 2012

Notable alumni

 Charlie Adams, former professional football player, Denver Broncos and Houston Texans (Class of 1998)
 Stan Gelbaugh, former professional football player, Phoenix Cardinals and Seattle Seahawks (Class of 1981)
 Joshua Gros, professional soccer player, D.C. United (Class of 2000)
 Katie Koestner, activist against sexual assault (Class of 1990)
 Chella Man, transgender artist and LGBTQ activist (Class of 2016)
 Alpesh Patel, filmmaker (Class of 1991)
 Jon Ritchie, former professional football player (Class of 1993), Oakland Raiders and Philadelphia Eagles
 Carla Sands, former U.S. ambassador to Denmark
 Scump, professional Call of Duty player (Class of 2013)
 Carla Thomas, former professional basketball player, Chicago Sky player (Class of 2003)
 Stacey Williams, actress and model (Class of 1986)
 Lucas Wolfe, professional racecar driver in the World of Outlaws Series (Class of 2005)

References

High schools in Central Pennsylvania
Eastern Pennsylvania Rugby Union
Educational institutions established in 1954
Schools in Cumberland County, Pennsylvania
Public high schools in Pennsylvania
1954 establishments in Pennsylvania
International Baccalaureate schools in Pennsylvania